Sisters Island is a small island with an area of , off Sisters Beach on the northwest coast of Tasmania, south-eastern Australia. The island is locally known as 'Snook Island' due to the large schools of Snook that local fishermen frequently come across close to the perimeter of the island.

Features
Much of the island is covered with a dense canopy of Coprosma repens.  Recorded breeding seabird and wader species include little penguin, short-tailed shearwater, Pacific gull and sooty oystercatcher.

History

Ship wrecks
L'Enterprise was a French schooner wrecked on the Island in 1802 or 1803.

References

Islands of Tasmania